David Isaac Hopkin (born 21 August 1970) is a Scottish professional football coach and former player who was most recently the manager of Ayr United.

As a player he was a midfielder from 1989 until 2003, notably in the English Premier League including spells with Chelsea, Leeds United and Bradford City. He also played in the Football League for Crystal Palace. He started and finished his career in his native Scotland with Greenock Morton. He earned seven caps for Scotland, scoring two goals.

Since retiring as a player he has worked as a coach at Greenock Morton and Livingston, becoming head coach of Livingston in 2015. Hopkin guided Livingston to successive promotions in 2017 and 2018, but opted to leave the club in May 2018. He then had short spells as manager of, successively, Bradford City, Greenock Morton and Ayr United.

Club career
Hopkin started his career at Morton before moving to Premier League side Chelsea in 1992. He did not play many games for Chelsea and was later sold to Crystal Palace in 1995 for £850,000 just after their relegation from the Premier League.

At Selhurst Park he wrote himself into Palace folklore by scoring a 90th-minute winner in the 1997 First Division play-off final against Sheffield United, to put Palace back into the Premier League. He also scored a key goal in the semi-final against Wolverhampton Wanderers. After two years with Palace, Hopkin moved on to Leeds United and then to their local rivals Bradford City.

He later went on to play for Crystal Palace again before returning to Scotland with his hometown club Greenock Morton in a player/coaching role – however he had to retire in 2003 due to a recurring ankle injury. During his second playing spell at Morton he scored twice, once in the League Cup against St Mirren and once in the league against Gretna.

International career
Hopkin won seven caps for the Scottish national team, scoring twice in a 1998 FIFA World Cup qualification match against Belarus.

Coaching career

Morton coach
Hopkin and Derek Collins had a brief spell as joint caretaker managers at Greenock Morton, when they occupied the dugout for a match against Albion Rovers in the 2002–03 season. Hopkin became part of the coaching staff at junior league club Maryhill, before returning to Cappielow as the manager of Morton's reserve side alongside Jonatan Johansson.

After Allan Moore was sacked as manager of Morton, Hopkin again took interim charge of the first team assisted by Derek Anderson. As well as continuing as manager of the Development squad, he became assistant manager to the newly appointed boss Kenny Shiels. Hopkin took Shiels' place as the club's match-day interviewee after Shiels became unable to do so on medical advice. Hopkin resigned as assistant manager of Morton in April 2014.

Livingston
Hopkin left his post as reserve team manager to become assistant head coach at Livingston to Mark Burchill. Hopkin took temporary charge of the Livingston first team after Burchill left the club in December 2015. After three games, Livingston appointed Hopkin as head coach until the end of the 2015–16 season. However, he could not prevent the team's relegation from the Scottish Championship.

Hopkin led the "Livi Lions" to the Scottish League One title and promotion back to the second tier after only one season, secured on 8 April 2017 with four games to play. In their first season back in the Championship, Livingston finished second in the division and reached the Premiership promotion/relegation playoff final. Livingston won the two-legged final against Partick Thistle, securing a second successive promotion. Hopkin opted to leave Livingston in May 2018, at the end of his contract.

Bradford City
Bradford City appointed Hopkin as their manager on 4 September 2018. Hopkin resigned on 25 February 2019, the team having won only seven of his 35 games in charge.

Morton
Hopkin was appointed manager of Scottish Championship club Greenock Morton in May 2019. He resigned in December 2020 after the club appeared to be in financial trouble .

Ayr United
Hopkin became manager of Ayr United in March 2021. He left this position six months later.

Career statistics

Scores and results list Scotland's goal tally first.

Managerial statistics

Honours

Managerial
Livingston
Scottish League One: 2016–17
Scottish Premiership play-offs : 2017–18

References

External links

1970 births
Living people
Footballers from Greenock
Scottish footballers
Greenock Morton F.C. players
Chelsea F.C. players
Crystal Palace F.C. players
Leeds United F.C. players
Bradford City A.F.C. players
Premier League players
Scottish Football League players
Greenock Morton F.C. non-playing staff
English Football League players
Scotland international footballers
Scotland B international footballers
Association football midfielders
Livingston F.C. non-playing staff
Livingston F.C. managers
Scottish Professional Football League managers
Bradford City A.F.C. managers
English Football League managers
Greenock Morton F.C. managers
Scottish football managers
Ayr United F.C. managers